Herbert Olbrich (1 July 1897 in Friedheim – 29 October 1976 in München) was a Luftwaffe Generalleutnant during World War II, and a recipient of the Slovak victory cross order. He was captured in Flensburg on 12 May 1945 and became a British prisoner of war between 12 May 1945 and 17 May 1948. On 9 January 1946 he was transferred to Island Farm Special Camp 11.

References

External links

Reichsmarine personnel
Imperial German Navy personnel of World War I
Lieutenant generals of the Luftwaffe
German World War I pilots
Luftwaffe World War II generals
German prisoners of war in World War II held by the United Kingdom
1897 births
1976 deaths
Recipients of the clasp to the Iron Cross, 1st class